Tina Pisnik was the defending champion but lost in the quarterfinals to Ángeles Montolio.

Montolio won in the final 3–6, 6–2, 6–4 against Mariana Díaz Oliva.

Seeds
A champion seed is indicated in bold text while text in italics indicates the round in which that seed was eliminated. The top two seeds received a bye to the second round.

  Kim Clijsters (finals)
  Sandrine Testud (semifinals)
  Ángeles Montolio (champion)
  Silvija Talaja (first round)
  Marlene Weingärtner (quarterfinals)
  Meilen Tu (second round)
  Ai Sugiyama (second round)
  Nathalie Dechy (second round)

Draw

Final

Top half

Bottom half

References
 2001 Croatian Bol Ladies Open Draw

Croatian Bol Ladies Open
2001 WTA Tour